Eleanor Zelliot (October 7, 1926 – June 5, 2016) was an American writer, professor of Carleton College and specialist on the India, Southeast Asia, Vietnam, women of Asia, Untouchables, and social movements.

Zelliot wrote over eighty articles and edited three books on the movement among Untouchables in India led by B. R. Ambedkar, on saint-poets of the medieval period, and on the Ambedkar-inspired Buddhist movement. She was one of the most prominent writers on Dalits of India. Eleanor Zelliot was an Ambedkarite thinker, and she has done scholarly writing on the Ambedkarite movement in India.

Zelliot died on June 5, 2016, in Minnesota.

Bibliography
 
 Ambedkar's World: The Making of Babasaheb and the Dalit Movement
 From Untouchable to Dalit: Essays on the Ambedkar Movement, Manohar Publishers, 1992.

See also
 Gail Omvedt

References

1926 births
2016 deaths
American Indologists
Carleton College faculty
American writers
Dalit studies
American historians